"No Guidance" is a song by American singer Chris Brown featuring vocals from Canadian rapper Drake. It was released on June 8, 2019, as the fourth single from Brown's ninth studio album, Indigo (2019). The song was written by Brown, Drake, Velous and Nija Charles, and produced by Vinylz, J-Louis, Teddy Walton, and Canadian producer 40.

"No Guidance" garnered positive reviews from music critics, who complimented the song's catchiness and Brown's vocal performance. The song received great success, becoming Brown's highest charting single as a lead artist on the Billboard Hot 100 since "Forever". The song dominated on both pop and hip-hop radio, breaking the record for most weeks at number one on the R&B/Hip-Hop Airplay, being subsequently surpassed by "Go Crazy", also by Brown. The song peaked at number five on the Billboard Hot 100, and also reached the top ten in Australia and New Zealand, Belgium, Canada, Czech Republic and UK. Among the certifications it gained, it was most notably certified octuple platinum by the Recording Industry Association of America (RIAA), quadruple platinum by the Australian Recording Industry Association (ARIA), and triple platinum by the Canadian Recording Industry Association  (MC).

The song won three Soul Train Music Awards and received a nomination for Best R&B Song at the 62nd Grammy Awards.

Background
Brown and Drake have had a history of feuds dating back to 2012 over singer Rihanna, which escalated in June of that year after friends of the musicians started throwing bottles at each other in a New York City nightclub. In 2013 Brown even dissed Drake on Young Jeezy's song "R.I.P. (Remix) " by rapping "Dearly departed, I bought a plane I departed/ And if you started from the bottom, go on and come out the closet," rhyming that on the song's final verse, making a clear reference to Drake and his "Started from the Bottom" single. The following years the artists sporadically made offensive comments aimed at each other, expressing their hatred. However, on October 12, 2018, Drake brought out the singer on his Aubrey & the Three Migos Tour date in Los Angeles and publicly ended their feud. The performance sparked rumors about a possible collaboration and Drake later teased a possible collaboration with Brown on Instagram in early 2019.

Following Brown's announcement of having collaborated with Drake on his Indigo album, snippets of the song, taken from Brown's 30th birthday party, were leaked online on May 5, 2019. On June 5, 2019, Brown teased the song on his social media and two days later announced that the song would be released that night. Even before its release, various news outlets called the song a contender for 2019's "Song of the Summer".

Drake, when discussing his reconciliation with Brown during a Tidal interview, talked about the making of the song, saying: “We’ve come together before and tried to link and make music and we were always kind of forcing it”, and after finally ending their beef in 2018 they found it more natural to work together. Drake stated: "I just always had a lot of admiration for his talent and I think finally he gave me the mutual respect and admiration by allowing me to take the lead on the song".

Composition
"No Guidance" is a mid-tempo R&B song. It was written by Brown, Drake, Velous and Nija Charles, while the production was handled by Vinylz, J-Louis, 40 and Teddy Walton. Its production contains an uncredited vocal sample of "Before I Die", written and performed by Che Ecru. In the song the two artists express to a woman their intention of establishing a life-changing love relationship with her, but also manifesting paranoia caused by respective mistakes that led to the end of their previous failed relationships.

Critical reception
Trent Clark of HipHopDX complimented the song, saying that it "serves as a timeless bluesy groove". Vulture'''s reviewer Craig Jenkins said that: "their first proper one-on-one collaboration, sparks but never exactly glows", finding it to be "too familiar", but ending up saying that "I’ll be stuck on it for the next few days either way". Desire Thompson of Vibe stated that the song proves that Brown and Drake "make a good R&B team".

Music video
The "No Guidance" music video was directed by Chris Robinson, and released on July 26, 2019. The video has a total run-time of 9 minutes and 6 seconds. Drake's reaction to Brown's dance during the dance battle, in which he quips "Ooo wow"'', has since garnered meme popularity. Singers Tory Lanez and Sevyn Streeter made cameo appearances in the video.

Synopsis
The video starts with some dialogue cuts that set up a party where the two artists accidentally meet. It later depicts the confrontation between Chris Brown and Drake surrounded by their crews and multiple ladies in a Miami carpark, which ends up being a dance battle. During the battle Brown executes a 
complex choreography of the song's last verse, while Drake responds with goofy dance moves, interpreted in a comical way. Following the confrontation, the two artists resolve their beef.

Commercial performance
In the United Kingdom, "No Guidance" debuted at number eight on the UK Singles Chart on the chart dated June 14, 2019, and moved up to number 6 in its second week charting. It serves as Brown's 16th top-ten song and Drake's 17th top ten on the chart. In the United States, the song debuted at number nine on the US Billboard Hot 100, making it Chris Brown's 15th top-ten song and Drake's 34th top ten on the chart. It later peaked at number five, making it Brown's first top five as a lead artist since "Forever" (2008). In Canada the song debuted at number 7.

The single was nominated for Best R&B Song at the 2020 Grammy Awards, but lost to PJ Morton's "Say So".

Personnel
Credits adapted from the album's liner notes.

 Chris Brown – lead vocals
 Drake – featured vocals
 Vinylz – production
 J-Louis – production
 Noah "40" Shebib– production
 Teddy Walton – production
 Patrizio Pigliapoco – recording
 Noel Cadastre – recording
 Noah "40" Shebib – mixing engineer
 Chris Athens – mastering engineer
 Eazy $ign – vocal engineer

Awards and nominations
The single won Best Collaboration Performance, Best Dance Performance and Song of the Year at the 2019 Soul Train Music Awards and received a nomination for Best R&B Song at the 62nd Grammy Awards.

Other versions
Tinashe released a remix of "No Guidance" on June 11, 2019. Fetty Wap released a freestyle of "No Guidance" on August 3, 2019.

A remix by artist Ayzha Nyree released in 2020 went viral on TikTok.

Charts

Weekly charts

Year-end charts

Certifications

References

2019 songs
Chris Brown songs
Drake (musician) songs
Songs written by Nija Charles
Songs written by Chris Brown
Songs written by Drake (musician)
Songs written by Teddy Walton
Songs written by 40 (record producer)
Songs written by Vinylz
Song recordings produced by 40 (record producer)
Internet memes introduced in 2019
Song recordings produced by Vinylz